Goodbye Flatland is a 2003 album by Canadian alternative rock band 54-40.

Track listing
 "Ride" – 3:53
 "Animal in Pain" – 2:50
 "Take Me Out" – 4:01
 "Hope the Hell I Haven't Died" – 3:11
 "Not Enough to Make You Happy" – 3:33
 "Who is Sylvia" – 4:18
 "Broken Girl" – 4:16
 "Goodbye Flatland" – 3:26
 "Secret" – 4:31
 "Giants" – 3:40
 "Seventeen On" – 4:23
 "Wish I Knew" – 2:48

Production
 Howard Redekopp - Producer, Engineer
 Warne Livesey - Mixer

2003 albums
54-40 albums